The Nyoro language (autonym: Runyoro) is a Bantu language spoken by the Nyoro people of Uganda. It has two dialects: Orunyoro (Nyoro proper) and Rutagwenda. A standardized orthography was established in 1947. It's most closely related to Rutooro.

Samples

See also
Runyakitara language

References

Languages of Uganda
Nyoro-Ganda languages